Lotabeg House is an Irish historic house in County Cork, used as a residence by Cork merchant families, built between 1780 and 1820. The house, gate lodge and entrance are listed buildings.

House
The house was designed by Abraham Hargrave and built for Sir Richard Kellett, first baronet. One of the owners of the house were the Mahony family who also owned Lotamore House. One owner of the house was Daniel Callaghan Esq MP. He had represented the city in Parliament but died on cholera in 1849. The house contained a domed hallway with a cantilever staircase. It has six bedrooms. The last owner to live in the house was Vincent Hart who died in 1939. Hart, an engineer, served with the British empire in India from 1903 and returned in 1936 to a newly independent country. When Hart died the house remained unchanged, minded by his wife Evelyn Hart and their descendants until the contents were auctioned in May 2016.

Entrance
The entrance, known as Callaghan’s Gate, is topped by an Irish Wolfhound. The entrance was designed by George Richard Pain. The gate was created to remember an incident where Daniel Callaghan was saved from drowning by his dog.

See also
List of historic houses in the Republic of Ireland

References

Buildings and structures in County Cork
Georgian architecture in Ireland